Antė is a Lithuanian male given name that is a diminutive form of Antanas. It is also a diminutive form of Anton, Antonio, and Antonijo in Lithuania.

References

Lithuanian masculine given names